The 2005 European Individual Speedway Junior Championship was the eighth edition of the Championship.

Qualification
Scandinavian Final (Semi-Final A):
May 28, 2005
 Målilla
Semi-Final B:
July 30, 2005
 Prelog
Semi-Final C:
August 7, 2005
 Daugavpils

Final
August 20, 2005
 Mšeno
Emil Sayfutdinov was exclusion because he was too young. Sayfutdinov (5th in Semi-Final C) was replace be Maksims Bogdanovs (6th in Semi-Final C and 2nd track reserve in Final). Bogdanovs as 2nd track reserve was replace be Marcin Jędrzejewski (7th in Semi-Final C).
21 heat: Race stopped: Buczkowski crashed. Buczkowski excluded.
21 heat restart: Race stopped: Kling crashed. Kling excluded.
Re-restart was canceled because was rain. Pettersson have three "3" (Hlib only two "3") and he was third.

References

2005
European I J